Lou Goodale Bigelow (November 24, 1884 – July 31, 1968) was an early 20th century American photographer.  She learned the art of photography from her father, Lyman Goodale Bigelow, and worked as an assistant to Roland W. Reed, a photographer of Native Americans.  She set up her own studio in San Diego in 1915 and over a 33-year career specialized in commercial portraits of guests staying at the Hotel del Coronado. Her portraits were frequently published in the San Diego Union newspaper; among her clients was Wallis Simpson, later the Duchess of Windsor. In later life, Bigelow painted portraits and landscapes.

Born to photographer Lyman Goodale Bigelow and his photographic assistant and wife Ada, Lou Adelaide Bigelow accepted a position as assistant to photographer Roland Reed in Kalispell, Montana, where Reed produced striking images of members of the Blackfoot nation. She accompanied Reed to California in early 1915, where he set up a studio in Coronado and showed photographs in the 1915 Panama–Pacific International Exposition; Bigelow purchased the studio from Reed in November of that year when he returned to Kalispell.

Bigelow was the subject of a 2000 exhibition "Lou Goodale Bigelow: An early Twentieth-Century Female Photographer and Artist" at the Coronado Museum of History and Art.

References

Further reading

1884 births
1968 deaths
American women photographers
People from St. Joseph, Missouri
Photographers from California